Eki is an Ibibio-Efik language of Nigeria.

References

Ibibio-Efik languages
Languages of Nigeria